This is a list of episodes from the eighth season of Alice.

Episodes

Broadcast history
Alice began the season airing Sunday nights at 8:00-8:30 pm (EST) from October 6 to October 2, 1983, before being moved to the 9:30-10:00 pm (EST) time slot on February 12, 1984, where it remained for the remainder of the TV season.

References

1983 American television seasons
1984 American television seasons